The women's 60 metres hurdles event  at the 1978 European Athletics Indoor Championships was held on 11 March in Milan.

Medalists

Results

Heats
First 2 from each heat (Q) and the next 6 fastest (q) qualified for the semifinals.

Semifinals
First 3 from each heat (Q) qualified directly for the final.

Final

References

60 metres hurdles at the European Athletics Indoor Championships
60
Euro